Soulanges  may refer to:

Soulanges (electoral district), a former federal electoral district in Quebec, Canada
Soulanges (provincial electoral district), a provincial electoral district in Quebec
Soulanges, Marne, a commune in the Marne department, France
Vaudreuil-Soulanges Regional County Municipality, Quebec
Claude-René Pâris, Count of Soulanges